Hamm is a quarter in eastern Luxembourg City, in southern Luxembourg.  It is the home of the Luxembourg American Cemetery and Memorial, the final resting place of 5,076 American servicemen, including General Patton.

, the quarter has a population of 1,478 inhabitants.

Commune

Hamm was a commune in the canton of Luxembourg between 20 December 1873, when it was split from the commune of Sandweiler, and 26 March 1920, when it was merged into the city of Luxembourg, along with Hollerich and Rollingergrund.

Footnotes

Quarters of Luxembourg City
Former communes of Luxembourg